[[|thumb]]

Karl Keska (born 7 May 1972 in Wolverhampton) is a male English former long-distance runner who specialised in the 10,000 metres.

Athletics career
Keska competed collegiately for University of Oregon from 1992–1996, where he was an All-American (10,000 m) and three time PAC-10 Conference Champion (10,000 m in 1995, 1996, cross-country in 1995). He was a two-time National Champion (AAAs) for Great Britain (5000 m 1998, 10,000 m 2003). He was an Olympic finalist in the 10,000 m in the 2000 Sydney Games where he represented Great Britain.

He represented England in the 5,000 metres event, at the 1998 Commonwealth Games in Kuala Lumpur, Malaysia.

International competitions

Personal bests
3000 metres - 7:38.04 min (1998)
5000 metres - 13:20.30 min (2002)
10,000 metres - 27:44.09 min (2000)

References

External links

1972 births
Living people
Sportspeople from Wolverhampton
English male long-distance runners
Olympic athletes of Great Britain
Athletes (track and field) at the 2000 Summer Olympics
Commonwealth Games competitors for England
Athletes (track and field) at the 1998 Commonwealth Games
World Athletics Championships athletes for Great Britain
Oregon Ducks men's track and field athletes